Steven J. D'Amico (born February 21, 1953, in Providence, Rhode Island) is an American politician who represented the 4th Bristol District in the Massachusetts House of Representatives from 2007 to 2011 and served as town meeting member in Seekonk, Massachusetts from 1989 to 1995.

References

1953 births
Democratic Party members of the Massachusetts House of Representatives
People from Seekonk, Massachusetts
University of Massachusetts Amherst alumni
Living people